John Butler (1885 – after 1915) was an English professional footballer who played in the Football League for Grimsby Town between 1904 and 1907. A full back who occasionally played as a forward, he joined Grimsby from Kiveton Park. On leaving the club in 1907, he played in the Southern League and the Western League for Plymouth Argyle, making 288 appearances in all competitions, before the First World War put an end to his football career.

References

1885 births
Year of death missing
Footballers from Sheffield
English footballers
Association football fullbacks
Kiveton Park F.C. players
Grimsby Town F.C. players
Plymouth Argyle F.C. players
English Football League players
Southern Football League players
Date of birth missing
Place of death missing